Webbers Falls is a town in southeastern Muskogee County, Oklahoma, United States. The population was 616 at the 2010 census, a decline of 14.9 percent from the figure of 724 recorded in 2000.

The name comes from a seven-foot waterfall in the Arkansas River  named in honor of Walter Webber, a Cherokee chief who established a trading post here in 1818. He was a leader among the Western Cherokee, also called "Old Settlers". They had a treaty with the United States government by 1828, which helped settle some conflicts with the Osage people, who had been forced to give up land to the Cherokee.

In the late 1830s and 1840, the mass of thousands of Cherokee from the Southeast were forcibly moved into Indian Territory as a result of the US policy of Indian Removal.

History
Webber had settled here with some of the first Cherokee to go to Indian Territory west of the Mississippi River; it was then considered part of Arkansas Territory. Having acquired a small fleet of keelboats, he was able to stock the post with goods from other parts of the United States, so he opened a trading post and a portage service, as well as building a house. Of mixed-race Cherokee-European descent, Webber was married to a full-blood Cherokee. They had adopted many American ways and outfitted their house in European-American style. When English-speaking visitors came, one of their African-American slaves and domestic servants would translate. Webber also built a salt works, leasing the land for the latter from the Cherokee government, which held it communally as a tribe. In the early years when Webber was in the territory, there was considerable conflict with the Osage people, who were forced by the United States government to give up some of their territory to the Cherokee, in a Treaty of 1828.
   
Webber was among the early leaders of the Cherokee in this area, one of their representatives when meeting with US agents and going to Washington, DC for meetings. The Western Cherokee resisted sharing their territory with immigrants to be resettled from the Southeast, as the US government proposed in 1834. They finally agreed that year, in exchange for an increased amount of land and annuities.

In the late 1830s and 1840, the mass of thousands of Cherokee from the Southeast were forcibly moved into Indian Territory as a result of the US policy of Indian Removal. According to the Webbers Falls Historical Museum, this is the second-oldest town in the former Indian Territory.
      
Joseph Vann, a/k/a "Rich Joe" Vann, was among the thousands of Cherokee emigrants forced from Georgia during Indian Removal.  He settled nearby and established a plantation, where he worked some of his more than 200 slaves he brought with him. At his direction, slaves built a house here that was a replica of his former antebellum mansion in Georgia, the Chief Vann House. This area was within the reservation of the Cherokee Nation.

A post office opened at Webbers Falls in 1856.

1842 Slave Revolt
On November 15, 1842, more than 25 slaves revolted in the largest action and escape in Cherokee territory. Mostly from Joseph Vann's and his father's plantations, the slaves locked masters and overseers in houses and cabins, stole guns and ammunition, horses and mules, food, and other supplies, then started traveling south. Their goal was to reach Mexico, where they knew slavery had been abolished. They picked up about 10 slaves in Creek territory along the way, and later freed a family of eight slaves from two slavecatchers, killing the latter.

After the first pursuers returned for reinforcements, the Cherokee National Council ordered about 87 men of the Cherokee Militia, under Captain John Drew, to apprehend the fugitives. The militia caught up with the fleeing slaves north of the Red River on November 28. The militia returned the fugitives to Tahlequah on December 8. Five were executed for having killed two slavecatchers they encountered to free a fugitive slave family from the Choctaw reservation. Vann put his surviving slaves to work as laborers and coal stokers on his steamboats.

Civil War
Cherokee Confederate General Stand Watie established a headquarters at Webbers Falls during the Civil War. In 1863, Union troops tried to capture Watie, but failed. Before leaving, they burned the town, including Vann's antebellum home.

20th century
In 1907, Brewer's Academy opened as the first school. Named for Oliver Hazard Perry Brewer, a local politician who had served as the Cherokee Nation's Superintendent of Education in 1870 and 1876, and as the Board of Education President in 1881.

The town suffered a major fire that destroyed much of the business district in 1911. It was rebuilt in the following year, with the new structures mostly constructed of brick. These still stand.

The town got a rail line to Warner, Oklahoma in 1911 courtesy of the Webbers Falls, Shawnee and Western Railroad.   That railway, which connected to the Midland Valley Railroad at Warner, ceased operations in 1914, was reorganized as the Webbers Falls Railroad in 1916, but was dismantled by 1918.

Construction in 1970 of the Webbers Falls Lock and Dam created Webbers Falls Reservoir and Robert S. Kerr Lock and Dam, created the Robert S. Kerr Reservoir, both part of the McClellan-Kerr Arkansas River Navigation System (MKARNS), operated by the U.S. Army Corps of Engineers. It has boosted the local economy by attracting outdoor enthusiasts for recreation opportunities. The town population increased 57 percent between 1980 and 2000, from 461 to 726. However, the population declined significantly by 2010.

21st century
The I-40 Bridge Disaster happened on May 26, 2002; a barge collided with a bridge support near Webbers Falls, causing a 580-foot section of the I-40 bridge to plunge into the Robert S. Kerr Reservoir on the Arkansas River. Automobiles and semi-trucks fell into the water, killing 14 people (including a three-year-old girl) and two horses. The bridge was repaired within two months, and reopened to traffic on July 29, 2002.

On May 22, 2019, two barges loaded with fertilizer broke loose from Muskogee County and were heading to Webbers Falls Lake. They were part of a tow that had been docked along the river because of the extremely high water level and the speed of the current. On the morning of May 23, 2019, the barges got stuck on some rocks and were later secured but, at around 10:40 AM the barges were on the loose after a helicopter attempted to safely secure the barges and around noon that same day hit the dam, which caused minor damage to the structure, but destroyed flood gates 7,8,and 9. The barges suffered major damage as they overturned and dumped their cargo into the flood, then sank to the base of the dam. Since the lake level had to be lowered significantly before the mangled barges could be removed, the flood gates could not be safely removed and the damaged gates repaired. This restricted traffic through the McClellan–Kerr Arkansas River Navigation System until late October 2019.

Geography
Webbers Falls is located at  (35.510052, -95.146554).

Demographics

As of the census of 2000, there were 726 people, 288 households, and 209 families residing in the town. There were 364 housing units at an average density of 93.6 per square mile (36.1/km2). The racial makeup of the town was 69.56% White, 0.28% African American, 24.79% Native American, 1.38% from other races, and 3.99% from two or more races. Hispanic or Latino of any race were 2.48% of the population.

There were 288 households, out of which 33.0% had children under the age of 18 living with them, 53.5% were married couples living together, 15.3% had a female householder with no husband present, and 27.4% were non-families. 24.0% of all households were made up of individuals, and 10.1% had someone living alone who was 65 years of age or older. The average household size was 2.52 and the average family size was 2.89.

In the town, the population was spread out, with 28.2% under the age of 18, 9.0% from 18 to 24, 24.5% from 25 to 44, 21.9% from 45 to 64, and 16.4% who were 65 years of age or older. The median age was 37 years. For every 100 females, there were 86.6 males. For every 100 females age 18 and over, there were 86.1 males.

The median income for a household in the town was $19,300, and the median income for a family was $22,955. Males had a median income of $22,813 versus $17,031 for females. The per capita income for the town was $10,684. About 22.0% of families and 26.2% of the population were below the poverty line, including 40.9% of those under age 18 and 14.9% of those age 65 or over.

Notable people
 Oliver Hazard Perry Brewer Sr., Cherokee politician, senator in Cherokee Nation (CN), superintendent of education, president of CN board of education, served one year on the CN Supreme Court;
 Oliver Hazard Perry Brewer Jr., son of the above, born in Webbers Falls, was postmaster in Muskogee; served three terms as Muskogee County judge, was CN "chief for a day" in 1931.
 Joseph Hanks, musician (fiddler), newspaperman, acclaimed as first historian of Webbers Falls.
 Stand Watie, Confederate General, retired here after the Civil War until his death in 1870.
 Joseph "Rich Joe" Vann", (1798-1844) early Cherokee settler and operator of a steamboat business, who died in 1844 when his steamboat, Lucy Walker, exploded on the Mississippi River.
 Walter Webber, founder and namesake of the Webbers Falls community.

Notes

References

Further reading
 Marguerite McFadden, "The Saga of 'Rich Joe' Vann," The Chronicles of Oklahoma 61 (Spring 1983).
 Marguerite McFadden, "Webbers Falls: Noted Historic Site in Muskogee County," The Chronicles of Oklahoma 51 (Spring 1973).

External links
 The I-40 Bridge Disaster
 http://www.city-data.com/city/Webbers-Falls-Oklahoma.html
 https://www.travelok.com/listings/view.profile/id.8431 Webbers Falls Historical Museum

Towns in Muskogee County, Oklahoma
Towns in Oklahoma
Oklahoma populated places on the Arkansas River
Populated places established in 1818